Deborah Keenan (born 1950, in Minneapolis) is an American poet.

Life
She is an editor for Milkweed Editions.
She also teaches at Hamline University.
She lives with her husband, Stephen Seidel, who is director of urban programs for Habitat for Humanity.  They have four children.

Awards
 Bush Foundation Fellowships for her poetry
 National Endowment for the Arts Fellowship
 The Loft McKnight Poet of Distinction award
 2006-2007 Edelstein Keller Minnesota author of Distinction at the University of Minnesota
 1991 American Book Award

Works
 One Angel Then, Midnight Paper Sales Press, 1981
 Household Wounds,	New Rivers Press, 1981, 
 The Only Window That Counts, New Rivers Press, 1985, 
 How We Missed Belgium, Milkweed Editions, 1984,  (written with Jim Moore)
 
 Good heart, Milkweek Editions, 2003, 
 Kingdoms, Laurel Poetry Collective, 2006, 
 Willow Room, Green Door: New and Selected Poems, March, 2007, Milkweed Editions.

Editor
 Looking For Home: Women Writing About Exile, editors Deborah Keenan, Roseann Lloyd, Milkweed Editions, 1990,

Anthology

References

External links

1950 births
Hamline University faculty
Living people
American women poets
American Book Award winners
American women academics
21st-century American women